Mushthak may refer to:

Given name
 Mushtaq Ahmed, Pakistani cricketer 
 Mushtaq Ali, Indian cricketer
 Mushtaq Gazdar, Pakistani cinematographer
 Mushtaq Kak, Indian actor
 Mushtaq Leghari, Pakistani air marshal
 Mushtaq Minhas, Pakistani journalist 
 Mushtaq Mohammad, Pakistani cricketer
 Mushtaq Omar Uddin (MC Mushtaq), English musician

Surname
Khadija Mushtaq, Pakistani academic administrator and educator
Mohammed Faisal Mushtaq, convicted of the racially motivated murder of Kriss Donald in Scotland
 Saqlain Mushtaq, Pakistani cricketer

Pakistani masculine given names